Albert Edward Parker (13 September 1927 – 29 October 2005) was an English footballer who played as a defender. He made a total of 329 appearances in the English football league with Crewe Alexandra and Wrexham.

Career
Parker started out as a schoolboy for Everton before moving to South Liverpool before the Second World War.

After the Second World War, Parker moved to Crewe Alexandra, making over 100 appearances in 3 years at the club.

In 1951, he moved to Wrexham where he made over 200 league appearances in 8 years. He scored 1 goal for Wrexham, a 60-yarder which bounced over the goalkeeper in a home match against Workington, which is the record for the longest goal scored at the Racecourse Ground.

After leaving Wrexham he moved to Holywell Town.

Post playing-career, Parker worked for Wrexham as a groundsman and a gatesman, and took up refereeing.

References

1927 births
2005 deaths
Association football defenders
South Liverpool F.C. players
Crewe Alexandra F.C. players
Wrexham A.F.C. players
Holywell Town F.C. players
English footballers